Luca D'Andrea (born 6 September 2004) is an Italian professional footballer who plays as an attacking midfielder or a right winger for  club Sassuolo.

Club career 

Born in Naples, D'Andrea started playing football at the grassroots schools Ponticelli, Mariano Keller and Azzurri, before entering S.P.A.L.'s youth sector in 2018, where he reached the semi-finals of the national under-17 championship in 2021. Then, in January 2022, he joined Sassuolo, signing his first professional deal in the process.

In the summer of the same year, he was officially promoted to the first team by manager Alessio Dionisi: he subsequently made his professional debut on 17 September, starting the Serie A match against Torino, which ended in a 0-1 win for his side.

In January 2023, D'Andrea extended his contract with Sassuolo until 2027.

International career 

D'Andrea has represented Italy at several youth international levels, having featured for the under-18 and under-19 national teams.

He was included in the under-18 squad that took part in the 2022 Mediterranean Games in Oran, as the Azzurrini eventually won the silver medal after losing to France (1–0) in the tournament's final match.

Style of play 

D'Andrea is a left-footed forward, who can play either as an attacking midfielder or an inverted winger on the right side. A diminutive player, he has been mainly regarded for key skills such as technique, ball control, speed, dribbling and shooting, as well as his work rate.

Career statistics

References

External links 
 
 

2004 births
Living people
Italian footballers
Association football midfielders
Association football forwards
S.P.A.L. players
U.S. Sassuolo Calcio players
Serie A players
Italy youth international footballers
Footballers from Naples
Sportspeople from Naples
Sportspeople from Campania